Jessica Erin Jackley (born October 29, 1977) is an American entrepreneur who co-founded Kiva and later ProFounder, two organizations that promote development through microloans.

Early life
Jackley grew up in Franklin Park, Pennsylvania. She graduated from North Allegheny Senior High School in 1996. She received her B.A. degree in philosophy and political science from Bucknell University in 2000 and an M.B.A. from the Stanford Graduate School of Business, with certificates in Public and Global Management.

Career
Jackley was the co-founder and CEO of ProFounder, a platform that provided tools for small business entrepreneurs in the United States to access start-up capital through crowdfunding and community involvement.

Prior to ProFounder, Jackley was co-founder and chief marketing officer of Kiva, the world's first p2p microlending website. Jackley and Matt Flannery (now her ex-husband) founded Kiva Microfunds in October 2005.

Jackley is a visiting scholar at Stanford University’s Center for Philanthropy and Civil Society, and has taught global entrepreneurship at the Marshall School of Business at USC.  She is a member of the Council on Foreign Relations, a 2011 World Economic Forum's Young Global Leader, and serves as an active board member on several organizations championing women, microfinance, tech, and the arts, including Opportunity International, the International Museum of Women, and Allowance for Good.

Jackley has worked in Kenya, Tanzania, and Uganda with Village Enterprise and Project Baobab. Jackley also spent three years in the Stanford GSB's Center for Social Innovation and Public Management Program, where she helped launch the inaugural Global Philanthropy Forum.

Jackley is a mentor of The Girl Effect Accelerator, a two-week business accelerator program that aims to scale startups in emerging markets that are best positioned to impact millions of girls in poverty.

Personal life
Jackley was previously married to Matt Flannery, co-founder of Kiva. She currently lives in Los Angeles with her second husband, Associate Professor of Creative Writing and best-selling author Reza Aslan, and their three sons. She is a Christian.

References

External links
 
 
 Jessica Jackley (TED Community member profile)
 "Poverty, money — and love" (TEDGlobal 2010)
 Clay Water Brick: Finding Inspiration from Entrepreneurs Who Do the Most with the Least

1977 births
Living people
American evangelicals
American nonprofit chief executives
American nonprofit executives
American women chief executives
Bucknell University alumni
People from Allegheny County, Pennsylvania
Stanford Graduate School of Business alumni
University of Southern California faculty
American women company founders
American company founders
Women nonprofit executives
21st-century Christians
American women academics
21st-century American women